Maurice Challe (5 September 1905 – 18 January 1979) was a French general during the Algerian War, one of four generals who took part in the Algiers putsch.

A native of Le Pontet, Vaucluse, and a veteran of the Second World War, Challe transmitted the Luftwaffe order of battle to the British prior to D-Day and backed De Gaulle's return to power. Challe initially served his conscription service in the infantry and was later commissioned as a pilot officer in military aviation, going on to become commander of the French Air Force in Algeria between 1955 and 1960.

In July 1956, Egyptian leader Gamal Abdel Nasser took control of the Suez Canal, in violation of agreements he had signed with the British and French governments. On 14 October 1956, Challe visited British Prime Minister Anthony Eden at Chequers, accompanied by French Minister of Labor Albert Gazier. The two Frenchmen told Eden of the secret negotiations between Israel and France regarding a proposed Israeli attack on Egypt followed with military occupation by European powers, to control the Suez Canal. Eden backed the plan with UK resources including military forces, directly leading to the Suez Crisis.

Challe was a French Air Force general whose greatest military success was in the realm of counter-insurgency operations during the Algerian War. His offensive, begun in March 1959, succeeded in substantially weakening the ALN. Through the use of speed and concentration of force, Challe kept the ALN insurgents in constant retreat and disorder. His innovative tactics would be studied and emulated by others - notably Syrian government forces in the Syrian Civil War seeking to keep insurgency at bay and off balance. The Challe Plan was only partially completed before he was reassigned to France.

A line of electrified wire, minefields and other military barriers, the Challe Line, was named after him. It doubled another defence work, the Morice Line, which fortified the border and separated Algeria from Morocco and Tunisia.

He was Commander-in-Chief Allied Forces Central Europe (CINCENT) from May 1960 to his deliberate resignation in February 1961.

Challe was one of the heads of the Algiers putsch of 1961, along with Raoul Salan, Edmond Jouhaud, and André Zeller. A prime reason for Challe's involvement was his concern that the  Muslim harkis who had served with the French Army against the FLN would be subject to reprisals in the event of Algerian independence. In the event, large numbers of these loyalists were massacred in 1962. After the failure of the putsch, he and Zeller surrendered to the French Army (while Salan and Jouhaud created the OAS). Challe was sentenced to 15 years imprisonment. He was freed in December 1966 and received amnesty from President de Gaulle in 1968. Challe died on 18 January 1979, aged 73, in Paris.

References 

1905 births
1979 deaths
People from Vaucluse
École Spéciale Militaire de Saint-Cyr alumni
French generals
French military personnel of World War II
French military personnel of the Algerian War
French prisoners and detainees
Grand Croix of the Légion d'honneur
Prisoners and detainees of France